The BMW B47 is a four-cylinder common rail diesel engine produced by BMW. It debuted in 2014 as the successor to the previous N47 engine.

Design 
The B47 engine is part of the modular family of engines, along with the B38, B48, and B58. The B47 complies with the Euro 6 emissions standard, and features a dual overhead camshaft with 4 valves per cylinder and a single turbocharger; while  and  engines feature twin-turbochargers. In November 2017, a technical update (codenamed B47TÜ1) added AdBlue injection and higher injection pressures. Twin turbo for both 318d and 320d.

Models

B47D20 (85 kW version) 
 2015–2019 F30/F31 316d

B47D20 (110 kW version) 
 2014–2016 F10 518d
 2014–present F45 218d Active Tourer
2014–present F46 218d Gran Tourer
 2015–present F20 118d
 2015–present F22 218d
 2015–present F25 X3 sDrive18d
 2015–2019 F30/F31/F34 318d
 2015–present F32/F36 418d
 2015–present F48 X1 sDrive18d
 2015–present F54 MINI Cooper D Clubman
 2017–present F39 X2 sDrive18d
 2017–present F60 MINI Cooper D Countryman
2018–present G30 518d
 2019–present G20 318d
 2019–present F40 118d

B47D20 (120 kW version) 
 2015–present F56 MINI Cooper SD
2015–2018 F30 320d EfficientDynamics Edition

B47D20 (140 kW version) 
 2014–2016 F10/F11 520d
 2014–present F26 X4 xDrive20d
 2014–present F45 220d Active Tourer
2014–present F46 220d Gran Tourer
 2015–present F20 120d/120d xDrive
 2015–present F22/F23 220d
 2015–present F25 X3 sDrive20d/xDrive20d
 2015–2019 F30/F31/F34 320d
 2015–present F32/F36 420d
 2015–present F48 X1 sDrive20d
 2015–present F54 MINI Cooper SD Clubman
 2016–present G30/G31 520d
 2017–present F39 X2 xDrive20d
 2017–present F60 MINI Cooper SD Countryman
2017–present G01 X3 xDrive20d
2018-present G02 X4 xDrive20d
 2018–present G32 620d Gran Turismo
 2019–present G20 320d
 2019–present F40 120d xDrive
 2019–current F44 220d Gran Coupé
 2021-present G42 220d

B47D20 (165 kW version) 
 2015–2019 F20 125d
 2015–2019 F22 225d
 2015–2018 F30/F31/F34 325d
 2016–2020 F32/F33/F36 425d

B47D20 (170 kW version) 
 2018–present G05 X5 xDrive25d
 2015–2018 F15 X5 sDrive25d/xDrive25d
 2016–present F48 X1 xDrive25d
 2017–2019 G30/G31 525d
 2018–present F39 X2 xDrive25d
 2016–2019 G11 725d/725Ld

References 

B47
Diesel engines by model
Straight-four engines